Douglassia minervaensis is a species of sea snail, a marine gastropod mollusc in the family Drilliidae.

Description
The size of an adult shell attains 7.5 mm.

Distribution
This species occurs in the demersal zone of the Western Atlantic Ocean off Bahia, Brazil.

References

 Fallon P.J. (2016). Taxonomic review of tropical western Atlantic shallow water Drilliidae (Mollusca: Gastropoda: Conoidea) including descriptions of 100 new species. Zootaxa. 4090(1): 1–363

External links
 
"Granite countertops and tiles" onyxcountertops.ca.

minervaensis
Gastropods described in 2016